Martin Wehrle (born 17 March 1970) is a German journalist, career advisor and non-fiction author. He is also known as an advocate of universal basic income (UBI).

Life 
Martin Wehrle was born on 17 March 1970 in Löffingen, Baden-Württemberg, West Germany (now part of Germany since German reunification in 1990).

He attended the Academy for Journalism in Hamburg and was deputy editor-in-chief of Blinker, a magazine for anglers. During this time he also won the European championship in pike fishing. He later headed two departments in an MDAX group and began to look at the management culture of German companies. In the early 2000s, Wehrle started his own career as a career consultant and in 2003 published the book Geheime Tricks für mehr Gehalt: ein Chef verrät, wie Sie Chefs überzeugen! (Secret tricks for higher salaries: a boss reveals how to convince bosses!) in which he gives recommendations for academics, employees, workers and young professionals who want to be better paid for their work. In the following years, he wrote more books about topics like career and salary. Today he heads the Karriereberater-Akademie (career counselor academy) in Hamburg, Germany, and, according to his own statement, has implemented the first training course for career counselors in Germany.

Reception 
According to German magazine Focus and Austrian magazine Kurier, Martin Wehrle is „Deutschlands bekanntester Karriere- und Gehaltscoach“ ("Germany's most famous career and salary coach").

Awards 

 1993: Reportagepreis of the Akademie für Publizistik Hamburg
 2016: Coaching-Award

Works

Career

Fishing 

 
 


External links 
Literature from and about Martin Wehrle in the German National Library

References 

1970 births
Living people
German journalists
German male journalists
German newspaper journalists
20th-century German journalists
Universal basic income in Germany